This is a list of the main career statistics of professional Italian tennis player Flavia Pennetta

Performance timelines
Only main-draw results in WTA Tour, Grand Slam tournaments, Fed Cup and Olympic Games are included in win–loss records.

Singles

Doubles

Significant finals

Grand Slam tournaments

Singles: 1 (1 title)

Doubles: 3 (1 title, 2 runner-ups)

WTA Finals finals

Doubles: 1 (1 title)

WTA Premier Mandatory & 5 finals

Singles: 1 (1 title)

Doubles: 10 (4 titles, 6 runner-ups)

WTA career finals

Singles: 25 (11 titles, 14 runner-ups)

Doubles: 34 (17 titles, 17 runner-ups)

ITF Circuit finals

Singles: 10 (7 titles, 3 runner-ups)

Doubles: 15 (9 titles, 6 runner-ups)

Record against top 10 players

Pennetta's match record against players who have been ranked in the top 10. Active players are in boldface.

No. 1 wins

Top 10 wins

Notes

External links
 Unofficial website
 
 
 

Tennis career statistics